Lake of the Woods is a census-designated place in Locust Grove, Orange County, Virginia. It is a gated subdivision covering approximately 2,600 acres with 4,260 lots (850 with lake frontage) distributed among 16 sections (many named after well-known southern names and landmarks). It includes more than 41 miles of paved private roads.

Lake of the Woods has grown into a bedroom community for Fredericksburg, within the trade area of Spotsylvania County, Virginia and points north toward Washington, D.C. The population as of the 2010 Census was 7,177.

Lake of The Woods zipcode 22508 population in 2022 is 15,052 according to Sperling Bestplaces <https://www.bestplaces.net/zip-code/virginia/lake_of_the_woods/22508>

Founded as a resort community built around a man-made lake, it now includes  two lakes: the Main Lake and Keaton's Lake. The Main Lake covers 500 acres and is fed by Flat Run and numerous springs. Veterans Memorial Dam, spanning 1,450 feet along the northwest edge of the Main Lake, was built in 1968. The Main Lake ranges in depth from two feet at the upper southwest end, where Flat Run feeds the lake, to 45 feet at the upper end near the dam. It has two marinas, seven lake access areas, and eight sand beaches. Keaton's Lake is a 35-acre impoundment about 7 feet deep, at the northeast corner of the community close to Route 3; its dam spans 450 feet.

Lake of the Woods has its own Volunteer Fire and Rescue Company.

Lake of the Woods was created in 1967 by Virginia Wildlife Clubs, a subsidiary of U.S. Land, Inc., and subsequently bought and developed by Boise Cascade Corporation. The Lake of the Woods Association, Inc.  assumed ownership and control in 1972.

References

Census-designated places in Orange County, Virginia
Census-designated places in Virginia
Populated places established in 1967
1967 establishments in Virginia